The Gulf Stream is a warm Atlantic Ocean current.

Gulf Stream or Gulfstream may also refer to:

Places
Gulf Stream, Florida, a town in the United States

Art, entertainment, and media
Gulf Stream Magazine, a literary magazine at Florida International University
The Gulf Stream (painting), a painting by Winslow Homer

Businesses
Gulf Stream Hotel, an historic hotel in Lake Worth Beach, Florida
Gulfstream Aerospace, manufacturer of private jet aircraft
Gulfstream Coach, a recreational vehicle manufacturer in Nappanee, Indiana
Gulfstream International Airlines, based in Fort Lauderdale, Florida
Gulfstream Park, a racetrack in Hallandale Beach, Florida